Throughout its 98-year history, a large number of Soccer Players from the Universitario de Deportes have worn the first team jersey and many of them have represented Peru on their national soccer team. Teodoro Fernández is the maximum idol of the institution, as well as its historical scorer with 156 goals. He is considered one of the best soccer players in the history of Peru.

When Teodoro Fernández began to think about his retirement, the soccer player Alberto Terry was the one who succeeded him and managed to win the appreciation of the club's fans.

This article lists footballers who currently are or have previously played for Peruvian football (soccer) team Universitario de Deportes.

List of players

All Time XI
Dimas Zegarra (1953–1968)
Carlos Tovar (1932–1943)
Héctor Chumpitaz (1966–1975)
Arturo Fernández (1930–1940)
Nicolás Fuentes (1964–1972)
Roberto Challe (1966–1972; 1977–1978)
Jose Cevallos Castro (1980-1983)
Percy Rojas (1967–1975; 1982–1984)
José Luis Carranza (1985–2005)
Alberto “Toto” Terry (1946–1958)
Teodoro “Lolo” Fernández (1931–1953)
Juan Carlos Oblitas (1969–1974; 1984–1985)

Noted Players

Peru
  Teodoro "Lolo" Fernández
  Alberto "Toto" Terry
  Socrates Enrique Strat Hoyos
  Héctor Chumpitaz
  Germán Leguía
  James Fernando Barrueto
  Luis Cruzado
  Arturo Fernández
  José Fernández
  Daniel Ruiz
  César Socarraz
  Segundo Castillo
  Juan Carlos Oblitas
  Roberto Martínez
  José Guillermo Del Solar
  Eduardo Malásquez
  Luis La Fuente
  Roberto Challe
  Juan Reynoso
  Óscar Ibáñez
  Luis Guadalupe
  Andrés Gonzalez
  Eduardo Rey Muñoz
  Fidel Suárez
  José Carranza
  Ronald Baroni
  Nolberto Solano
  Enrique Cassaretto
  Ángel Uribe
  Alfonso Yañez
  Martín Rodríguez
  Freddy Ternero
  Jaime Drago
  Juan José Oré
  Hugo Gastulo
  Víctor Calatayud
  Samuel Eugenio
  Ismael Soria
  Jorge Góngora
  Javier Chirinos
  Leonardo Rojas
  Luis Reyna
Uruguay
 Luis Celabe
 Ruben Techera
 Diego Guastavino
 Tomás Silva
Honduras
 Eugenio Dolmo Flores
Brazil
 Alex Rossi
 Eduardo Esidio
Chile
 Cristián Álvarez
 Juan Carlos Letelier

Colombia
 Mayer Candelo
 Héctor Hurtado
|
  Nicolás Fuentes
  Percy Rojas
  Juan Carlos Bazalar
  Oswaldo Ramírez
  Héctor Bayletti
  Manuel Francisco Barreto
  Luis Rubiños
  Fernando Cuellar
  Carlos Carbonell
  Juan José Muñante
  Hernán Rengifo
  Humberto Horacio Ballesteros
  Cesar Chávez-Riva
  Víctor Lobatón
  Dimas Zegarra
  Enrique Cassaretto
  Rubén Diaz
  Eleazar Soria
  César Charún
  John Galliquio
  Rubén Correa
  Percy Vílchez
  Eusebio Acasuzo
  Marko Ciurlizza
  Juan Pajuelo
  Giuliano Portilla
  Paolo Maldonado
  Julio Rivera
  Carlos Orejuela
  Fernando del Solar
  Santiago Acasiete
  Juan Cominges
  Piero Alva
  Gregorio Bernales
  Johan Fano
  Juan Manuel Vargas
  José Carvallo
  Miguel Cevasco

Paraguay
  Darío Caballero
  Jorge Amado Nunes
 Miguel Angel Benítez
 Gabriel González
Argentina
 Marcelo Asteggiano
 Martin Vilallonga
 Gustavo Grondona
 Mauro Cantoro
 Beto Carranza
 Óscar Ibáñez
 Adrián Coria
 Adrian Czornomaz
 Gastón Sangoy
 Juan Carlos Zubczuk
 Rafael Maceratesi
  Carlos Galván
  Juan Manuel Azconzábal
  Gustavo Falaschi
  Fernando Alloco

Retired numbers 
 9 –  Teodoro "Lolo" Fernández, forward (1930–53) – Number retired since the 2013 season.
 22 –  José Luis Carranza, midfielder (1986–04)

Current squad 2023

References

 
Universitario de Deportes
Association football player non-biographical articles